Annastasia is a feminine given name. Notable people with this name include

Annastasia Baker (born 1988), British Gospel singer and song writer
Annastasia Batikis (1927 – 2016), American baseball player
Annastasia Raj (born 1975), Malaysian racewalker

See also 

Annastacia Palaszczuk (born 1969), Australian politician
Anastacia (given name)
Anastasia
Anastasiia
Anastasija
Anastasiya

Feminine given names